Dolor de garganta is the eighth album released in 1999 by Javier Krahe. In 1998 Javier Krahe found the label 18 Chulos with Pepín Tre, Santiago Segura, el Gran Wyoming, Faemino and Pablo Carbonell, and this album is edited by it.

Track listing

References

1999 albums
Albums by Spanish artists